Fancy Nancy The Musical is a musical with book and lyrics by Susan DiLallo, and music and lyrics by Danny Abosch. It is based on Fancy Nancy and the Mermaid Ballet, part of the popular Fancy Nancy book series by Jane O'Connor, illustrated by Robin Preiss Glasser.

Productions

The original Off-Broadway production, commissioned and produced by Vital Theatre Company, Inc, opened on September 29, 2012 at the McGinn/Cazale Theater. The production featured Aly Bloom as Nancy and Darilyn Castillo as Bree, and was directed by Sam Viverito. The production was reviewed by The New York Times and other sources. The musical closed Off-Broadway in 2015 and has since been produced by various theatres throughout the country with licensing through the Susan Gurman Agency.

Plot synopsis
Fancy Nancy is so excited to audition for the school play.  But her fancy world crumbles when she learns she's not cast as a mermaid but she'll be playing a tree!  With the help of her friends Nancy rallies and the play is a huge success, with the fanciest tree dance ever.

Original Cast
Nancy - Aly Bloom
Bree - Darilyn Castillo
Wanda - Jes Dugger
Lionel - Kyle Motsinger
Mom - Amanda Savan
Rhonda - Tricia Giordano

Song list

 Overture
 Anyone Can Be Fancy
 What I'll Be
 I'm A Tree
 You'll Always Feel Much Better After Tea
 On My Team
 Something Terrible
 You'll Always Be My Star
 The Deep Sea Dances Ballet
 A Fancier Place

Recording
The Original Off-Broadway Cast Recording was released on Ghostlight Records.

Awards and nominations
 2013 “CD Of The Year Award” from Creative Child Magazine's 2013 Creative Child Awards Program
 “Gold Award” from Family Review Center
 “Seal of Approval” from Family Review Center
 “Editor's Choice” from Family Review Center
 2013 “Silver Winner” from National Parenting Publications Awards (NAPPA)

References

External links
 

2012 musicals
Off-Broadway musicals